Incisimura is an extinct genus of sea sponges in the family Guadalupiidae, that existed during the Permian period in what is now Texas, United States. It was described by Robert M. Finks in 2010, and the type species is Incisimura bella.

References

External links
 Incisimura at the Paleobiology Database

Guadalupiidae
Fossil taxa described in 2010